Inheritance is a 2020 American thriller film directed by Vaughn Stein from a screenplay by Matthew Kennedy. The film stars Lily Collins, Simon Pegg, Connie Nielsen, Chace Crawford and Patrick Warburton. Inheritance was released on May 22, 2020, by Vertical Entertainment. It received generally negative reviews from critics.

Plot
In 2008, Archer Monroe, the patriarch of a wealthy and powerful political family in New York City, dies. His estate is divided among his family: Catherine, his wife; William, his younger son, a politician running for re-election; and Lauren, his elder daughter, the Manhattan district attorney. Family attorney Harold Thewlis privately shows Lauren her father's posthumous video message he left her. In the video, he says he has a secret to tell her that she must take to her grave. He directs her to a secret underground bunker on the family's property. There she finds a  captive man who identifies himself as Morgan Warner, who says he has been held prisoner for 30 years.

Morgan claims he was Archer's friend and business partner until one night, while driving drunk, they killed a pedestrian. At Archer's insistence, they covered up the crime before Archer took Morgan prisoner to prevent his exposing the homicide. In the intervening years, Archer treated Morgan like a confessor and admitted many secrets. As proof, Morgan directs Lauren to where the pedestrian's body is buried. Lauren also follows Morgan's clues and finds Archer's longtime mistress, with whom he had a son, as well as evidence that Archer paid bribes to aid his children being elected to public office. Lauren is eventually convinced to free Morgan, and, believing he was wronged, directs Harold to set up an offshore bank account and charter a private jet so Morgan can disappear.

While Morgan was asleep, Lauren took a sample of his fingerprints and sent them for identification. The fingerprints are matched and the file sent to the Monroe house. Catherine sees the file and is terrified by photos of Morgan, whom she identifies as "Carson", claiming he is an "evil man". Lauren discovers Morgan's flight never left and Harold has been murdered. By the time Lauren returns to the Monroe house, Morgan has abducted Catherine and taken her to the bunker. Carson subdues Lauren and reveals that thirty years ago, he drugged and raped Catherine. Archer was taking Carson somewhere to kill him when they hit the pedestrian; furthermore, Carson was responsible for Archer's death, using the poison Archer had intended to use on him. Lauren fights back and, during their struggle, Carson claims he is Lauren's biological father before Catherine seizes his gun and shoots him dead. Together, Lauren and Catherine pour gasoline throughout the bunker and set it afire, destroying all evidence of Carson's captivity.

Cast
Lily Collins as Lauren Monroe
Simon Pegg as Morgan Warner/Carson
Connie Nielsen as Catherine Monroe
Chace Crawford as William Monroe
Michael Beach as Harold Thewlis
Marque Richardson as Scott Monroe

Patrick Warburton as Archer Monroe

Rebecca Adams as Jen Monroe
Mariyah Francis as Claire Monroe
Joe Herrera as Detective Emilio Sanchez
Lucas Alexander Ayoub as Eddie Parker
Christina DeRosa as Sofia Fiore

Production
In November 2018, it was announced Simon Pegg and Kate Mara had joined the cast of the film, with Vaughn Stein directing from a screenplay by Matthew Kennedy. Richard B. Lewis, David Wulf, Dan Reardon and Santosh Govindaraju will produce the film, under their Southpaw Entertainment, WulfPak Productions and Convergent Media banners, respectively. From January to March 2019, Connie Nielsen, Chace Crawford and Patrick Warburton joined the cast of the film, while Lily Collins joined to replace Mara. In April 2019, Marque Richardson joined the cast of the film.

Principal photography began in February 2019 in Birmingham, Alabama.

Release
It was scheduled to have its world premiere at the Tribeca Film Festival on April 20, 2020. However, the festival was postponed due to the COVID-19 pandemic. Vertical Entertainment and DirecTV Cinema acquired distribution rights to the film and set it for a May 22, 2020 release.

Critical reception
The site's critics consensus reads: "A would-be thriller that waits far too long to embrace the daffy potential of its bizarre premise, this Inheritance should be steadfastly refused." On Metacritic, the film holds a rating of 31 out of 100, based on 16 critics, indicating "generally unfavorable reviews". The movie received two stars in a review at RogerEbert.com, where Nell Minnow wrote, "it just qualifies as watchable due to its nutty premise, sumptuous settings, and a couple of dynamic confrontations."

References

External links
 
 
 

2020 films
2020 thriller films
2020s mystery thriller films
Films about the upper class
American thriller films
American mystery thriller films
Films about missing people
Vertical Entertainment films
Films about rape
Films set in New York City
2020s English-language films
Films directed by Vaughn Stein
2020s American films
Films set in bunkers
Works about prosecutors